Mano Film (formerly Mano Produktion) is a Swiss film production company located in Zurich, Switzerland. It was founded in 1987 by Anka Schmid, Agnes Barmettler and Rachel Schmid and produced several feature films. In 2001 Anka Schmid became the sole proprietress. The production company has since specialized in producing interdisciplinary film and art projects.

Film and art projects 
 2016: La Dada – King Deer (short film)
 2014: Sophie tanzt trotzdem (video installation)
 2013: Fe-Male (short film, video installation)
 2012: Marzili Badi (experimental video)
 2011: Wasserballett (art video, room installation)
 2011: Mäusemuseum (short documentary)
 2011: Musée Bizarre (portrait of a museum)
 2010: TV-Stube (art video)
 2008: Hierig – Heutig (art installation, short film)
 2006: Found Footage I–XI (art videos, installations, interventions)
 2004: Perpetuum Mobile (experimental video)
 2002: Onoma (6 short films for Swiss Expo02)
 2000: Das Engadiner Wunder (short film, art installation)
 1997: Labyrinth-Projektionen (art video)
 1998: Little Sister (portmanteau film, co-produced with Thelma Film, Zurich/Switzerland)
 1994: Magic Matterhorn (feature documentary, co-produced with Insert Film, Solothurn/Switzerland)
 1991:  Behind Locked Doors (feature film, co-produced with the German Film and Television Academy Berlin)
 1989: Techqua Ikachi, Land - My Life (feature documentary)

References

External links 
 Mano Film on IMDb
 Mano Film on Swissfilms
 Mano Film on www.ankaschmid.ch (German)

Film production companies of Switzerland
Companies based in Zürich